The viridian dacnis (Dacnis viguieri) is a species of bird in the family Thraupidae. It is found in Colombia and Panama.

Its natural habitat is subtropical or tropical moist lowland forests. It is threatened by habitat loss.

References

Dacnis
Birds described in 1883
Taxa named by Osbert Salvin
Taxa named by Frederick DuCane Godman
Taxonomy articles created by Polbot